Roger William Haun III (known as Trey or by his Mampruli name Manboora) is a US-born Ghanaian unicyclist. He is the first person to win medals at the Unicycling World Championships for Ghana.

Early life 
Haun was born in the USA and later moved to Ghana with his parents. They arrived in Nalerigu in the North East Region.

Career 
Haun developed interest in unicycling during the COVID-19 pandemic of 2020. He joined the Unicycling Society of America in 2021 and reached USA Flatland Level 3 in 2022. Haun initially won a youth silver medal in the 30m Wheel Walk Race (Male 15-16 category) and later won the youth bronze medal in the 50m One-Foot Race (Male 15-16 category). He represented Ghana at the 2022 Unicycle Convention and World Championships where he won two medals making it the nation's first medals in the competition.

Awards 
Trey received the "Young Achievers & Innovators" award from Ghana's Head of State Awards Scheme on December 19, 2022 under the patronage of His Exellency Nana Akufo-Addo at Jubilee House in Accra. He was nominated for a GhanaWeb 2022 Youth Excellence Award in the category of Sports but lost to footballer Thomas Partey.

Personal life 
Haun's parents William Haun and Heidi Haun at the Baptist Medical Centre where his mother is a surgeon and his father is a multimedia specialist. Trey Haun is also a musician who composes and records folktronica under the moniker Hilarious Movies of the 30s.

References 

Living people
Unicyclists
2006 births